John Pryce (25 January 1874 – December 1905), also known as Jack or Johnny Pryce, was a Scottish professional footballer who played as a centre forward or inside forward in the Scottish League for Renton and Hibernian, in the English Football League for Glossop North End and Sheffield Wednesday, and in the Southern League for Queens Park Rangers and Brighton & Hove Albion.

Life and career
Pryce was born in Renton, Dunbartonshire, in 1874. He joined his local Scottish League club, Renton, in 1893. He helped them reach the 1895 Scottish Cup Final, taking two replays to beat Dundee in the semi-finals, but the then Second Division club lost 2–1 to St Bernard's.

In May 1896, Pryce moved on to Hibernian. He was ever-present as Hibs finished runners-up in his first season, and his 11 goals from 20 matches in league and cup made him the club's top scorer. He was selected at centre forward for Scotland's team to play Wales in the Home Championships in March 1927, but had to withdraw because of injury. In his second season with Hibs, he scored 3 goals from 16 matches as his team finished a distant third.

In the 1898 close season, Pryce became one of numerous Scottish professionals enticed over the border by Samuel Hill-Wood, then the wealthy and ambitious owner of Glossop North End, newly elected to the English Second Division, who would later become chairman of Arsenal. Pryce contributed 6 goals from 20 league matches as the team finished as runners-up and were promoted to the First Division, by which time he had moved on to Sheffield Wednesday, already a top-tier club.

Pryce's arrival failed to lift his new club off the foot of the table, but he was involved in a strange ending to a match. In November 1898, After Wednesday's match at home to Aston Villa in November 1898 was abandoned after 79 minutes because of bad light, the Football Association ordered it to be completed at a later date. On 13 March 1899, the remaining 11 minutes were duly played, but with several changes in personnel, one of which was the inclusion of Pryce, who had not even been at the club at the time of the original fixture. He played in 31 of the 34 Second Division matches as Wednesday won the 1899–1900 title and returned to the top flight, and played in about half of the First Division fixtures in 1900–01.

Pryce then spent two seasons with Queens Park Rangers: he played in half of a possible 30 Southern League matches in his first season but appeared in only 5 in 1902–03. He joined another Southern League club, Brighton & Hove Albion, in October 1903, made his debut in December, and was ever-present until the end of the season, but played only twice in 1904–05.

He returned to his native Scotland, where an accident left him unable to work and thus unable to support his wife and three children. In late October 1905, he was reported to be "lying very ill at Renton, there being faint hopes of his recovery." A benefit match arranged in mid-November between Old Rentonians, featuring well-known players including Scotland internationals James McCall], Neil McCallum, Duncan McLean and John Murray, and the Scottish Amateurs was well supported. Pryce died at Renton in early December at the age of 30.

Career statistics

Honours
Renton
 Scottish Cup runner-up: 1894–95
Hibernian
 Scottish Football League runner-up: 1896–97
Glossop North End
 Football League Second Division runner-up: 1898–99
Sheffield Wednesday
 Football League Second Division winner: 1899–1900

References

1874 births
1905 deaths
Scottish footballers
Association football forwards
Renton F.C. players
Hibernian F.C. players
Glossop North End A.F.C. players
Sheffield Wednesday F.C. players
Queens Park Rangers F.C. players
Brighton & Hove Albion F.C. players
Scottish Football League players
English Football League players
Southern Football League players
People from Renton, West Dunbartonshire
Footballers from West Dunbartonshire